FAM83H is a gene in humans that encodes a protein known as FAM83H (uncharacterized protein FAM83H). FAM83H is targeted for the nucleus and it predicted to play a role in the structural development and calcification of tooth enamel.

Gene

Location

FAM83H is located on the long arm of chromosome 8 (8q24.3), starting at 143723933 and ending at 143738030. The FAM83H gene spans 14097 base pairs and is orientated on the—strand. The coding region is made up of 5,604 base pairs and 5 exons.

Expression

FAM83H is ubiquitously expressed throughout the human body at relatively low levels.

Transcript Variants
In humans, there is only one known major product of the FAM83H gene.

Homology

Paralogs
There are no paralogs of FAM83H

Orthologs
Below is a table of a variety of orthologs of the human FAM83H. The table include closely, intermediately and distantly related orthologs.

Orthologs of the human protein FAM83H are listed above in descending order or date of divergence and then ascending order of percent identity. FAM83H is highly conserved throughout all orthologs, this is demonstrated with a 40% identity in the least similar ortholog. FAM83H has evolved slowly and evenly over time.

Protein

General Properties
The molecular weight of FAM83H is 127.1kD and contains 1179 amino acids. The isoelectric point is 6.52. There are no significant positive or negative charge clusters in the protein. There is a stretch of 21 0’s from 254-275 and a stretch of 24 0’s from 420-444.1

Composition
FAM83H is proline rich, being 10.32% protein, and is asparagine deficient with only 1.1%. The percent composition of each amino acid is fairly consistent throughout the orthologs of the protein. The most distant ortholog displays the most variance in amino acid composition.

Domains

FAM83H has two known domains. The PLDc_FAM83H (phospholipase like domain) domain stretches from 17-281 on FAM83H. It lacks the functionally important histidine, so while it may share similar structure it most likely lacks PLD activity. The MIP-T3 microtubule binding domain stretches from 909-1176.

Post-translational modifications
FAM83H is highly phosphorylated post modification. There are 11 predicted phosphorylated sites. There are two motifs with high probability of post translational modification sumoylation sites. Sumoylation sites are involved in a number of cellular processes, including nuclear-cytosolic transport, transcriptional regulation and protein stability. FAM83H does not have a signal peptide

Secondary Structure
Fam83H is primarily composed of alpha helices and random coils. Alpha helices comprise the majority of the protein. There is a transmembrane domain from 231-252.

Subcellular Localization
Protein FAM83H is targeted to the nucleus.

Interacting Proteins

FAM83H was found to interact with WDR72 and MMP20. MMP20 is responsible for the breakdown of extracellular matrix and plays a role in tissue remodeling in ameloblasts. mutations in WDR72 is thought to play a role in amelogenesis imperfecta

Clinical Significance

Disease Association
People who suffer from amelogenesis imperfecta have lost function in FAM83H.

References

Further reading